The El Manar Preparatory Engineering Institute or  IPEIEM, is a Tunisian university establishment created according to the law N°2001-1912 on August 17, 2001. Part of the University of Tunis El Manar

Mission 
Its mission is to prepare students for the national entrance exam to engineering schools.

Departments 
The Institute provides several primary cycle course specialties which consists of four independent departments:
 Physics (PH)
 Chemistry (CH)
 Math and computing (MI)
 Engineering Sciences and Technology (STI)

See also

Preparatory Institute 
 Tunis Preparatory Engineering Institute
 Monastir Preparatory Engineering Institute
 Preparatory Institute for Engineering Studies of Nabeul
 Sfax Preparatory Engineering Institute

Other 
 University of Tunis El Manar

References

External links 
 

Universities in Tunisia
2001 establishments in Tunisia